DSU is the fifth studio album by American musician Alex G, released on June 17, 2014, through Orchid Tapes.

Title
The title of the album is an acronym of Dream State University. It is derived from a comment Giannascoli's older sister, Rachel, had made. He explained

Critical reception

At Metacritic, which assigns a normalized rating out of 100 to reviews from mainstream publications, DSU received an average score of 79, based on 13 reviews, indicating "generally favorable reviews". Samme Maine of Drowned in Sound wrote, "Alex G speaks a refreshing honesty, with an artistic flair that many before him have failed to master. It's careful yet effortless, passionate yet distant but above-all, wholly unique." NMEs Ben Homewood stated that the album "skillfully combines Neil Young's dusty American songcraft with scratchy lo-fi and wandering electronic influences." Dean Essner of Consequence of Sound said, "At its best, DSU cycles through that duality with aplomb, which will serve as an excellent introduction to his gigantic discography for all new fans." Clashs Mat Smith stated that the album "is enduring evidence that the purest, most interesting music inevitably comes without hefty production or marketing budgets." Rolling Stone critic Simon Vozick-Levinson said, "The more you listen, the more obvious it is that Alex G is a bright new talent in his own right."

Accolades

Track listing

Personnel
Credits adapted from the liner notes of DSU.
 Alex Giannascoli – production, recording
 Emily Yacina – vocals 
 Samuel Acchione – tambourine 
 Warren Hildebrand – mastering
 Jason Mitchell – additional mastering
 Rachel Giannascoli – artwork

Release history

References

2014 albums
Alex G albums